Juoksija (Finnish: Runner) is a Finnish language sports magazine which focuses on endurance sports, fitness, healthy living and running. Founded in 1971, the magazine is one of the earliest publications in this category in Europe.

History and profile
Juoksija was launched in 1971, and the first issue appeared on October that year. The founders are Finnish brothers Tapio and Heikki Pekola. The magazine is published ten times per year.

Tapio Pekola served as the editor-in-chief of Juoksija until 1998 who remained in the editorial board of the magazine until 2008. Another editor-in-chief was Ari Paunonen.

Juoksija sold 20,537 copies and had 72,000 readers in 2017.

References

External links

1971 establishments in Finland
Finnish-language magazines
Magazines established in 1971
Magazines published in Helsinki
Sports magazines
Ten times annually magazines